Cedar Grove Bridge, also known as Indiana State Bridge #6625B, was a historic Camelback Pratt Through Truss bridge spanning the Whitewater River in Cedar Grove and Highland Township, Franklin County, Indiana.  The bridge had two spans and was built in 1914.  Each span of the bridge was 180 feet long, and the overall length of the bridge was 386 feet and had a roadway 18 feet wide.

The bridge carried State Route 1 over the river until 1999, when it was closed. It was listed on the National Register of Historic Places in 2014. It was demolished on February 17, 2016.

References

Truss bridges in the United States
Road bridges on the National Register of Historic Places in Indiana
Bridges completed in 1914
Transportation buildings and structures in Franklin County, Indiana
National Register of Historic Places in Franklin County, Indiana